Saint Joseph's Hospital is a non-profit hospital in Providence, Rhode Island, which opened on April 6, 1892. The hospital is sponsored by the Roman Catholic Diocese of Providence. The Diocese merged St. Joseph and Our Lady of Fatima Hospital in the early 1970s.

See also
List of hospitals in Rhode Island

References

External links
Saint Joseph's / Fatima Hospital, Official site

Hospital buildings completed in 1892
Organizations based in Providence, Rhode Island
Buildings and structures in Providence, Rhode Island
Hospitals in Rhode Island
Roman Catholic Diocese of Providence
Catholic hospitals in North America